The DRG Class 37 was a class of German steam locomotives with 2-6-0 wheel arrangements operated by the Deutsche Reichsbahn and may refer to the following:

 Class 37.0-1: Prussian P 6
 Class 37.1-2: PKP Class Oi1
 Class 37.2: LBE G 6
 Class 37.3: ČSD Class 344.0
 Class 37.4: PKP Class  Oi101